Matley is a semi-rural area of Greater Manchester, England, between Stalybridge, Hyde and Dukinfield. Matley was a township of Mottram in Longdendale, one of the eight ancient parishes of the Macclesfield Hundred of Cheshire. Under the Poor Law Amendment Act 1886 the township became a civil parish in its own right.

Between 1894 and 1936, Matley was a civil parish in the Tintwistle Rural District of Cheshire. The parish was abolished in 1936 and divided between the municipal boroughs of Stalybridge, Hyde and Dukinfield. In 1974, these boroughs were abolished and  the area transferred to Greater Manchester to form part of the Metropolitan Borough of Tameside.

References

Geography of Tameside
Areas of Greater Manchester
Towns and villages of the Peak District